RNB Global University (RNBGU) is a private university located at Bikaner, Rajasthan, India. The university was established by the Ram   Bajaj Foundation Society through the RNB Global University, Bikaner Act, 2015. The University is spread on a 300-acre campus and offers courses in various disciplines.

Schools 
The University houses various academic schools:
School of Commerce and Management
School of Journalism and Mass Media
School of Arts and Social Science
School of Tourism and Hospitality Management
School of Law
School of Science
School of Design
School of Planning and Architecture
School of Medical Sciences
School of Engineering and Technology
School of Education

These schools provide both under graduate and post graduate programmes.

See also
 List of institutions of higher education in Rajasthan

References

External links 
 

Private universities in India
Universities and colleges in Bikaner
University of Rajasthan
Educational institutions established in 2015
2015 establishments in Rajasthan
Universities in Rajasthan